Hitlerszalonna (Hungarian: "Hitler bacon"), known in the modern day as sütésálló lekvár ("ovenproof jam"), is a dense fruit jam that originated in the Kingdom of Hungary during World War II. It was sold in brick shaped blocks held in a piece of paper, and was sliced like szalonna. Soldiers kept it in a case and it could be cooked with other foods. In the modern day, sütésálló lekvár is often sold in small portion cups. The term itself is considered slang and defined as something like "tough fruit".

Etymology 
 
One possible source of this name derives from military rations given to soldiers of the Royal Hungarian Army. In armed conflicts under Austria-Hungary, Hungarian soldiers received normal bacon as part of their rations, nicknamed "Kaiser-bacon", referring to the Kaiser of Austria.

During World War II, Hungarian soldiers received rations from Nazi Germany, but often received fruit jam instead of bacon. The soldiers continued to refer to this as the emperor's bacon, and the "emperor" was Führer Adolf Hitler.
 
This expression has also appeared in a printed book.  When describing the Royal Hungarian Army's logistical situation at the Don River and before the Battle of Stalingrad, the account (as translated below into English) states that:

See also
 Turkish delight, a similar pectin based food
 Hungarian cuisine
 Hungary during World War II
 List of plum dishes
 Quince cheese

References

Squashes and pumpkins
Hungarian cuisine
Cultural depictions of Adolf Hitler
Plum dishes
Jams and jellies
Military food
Hungary in World War II